Matthews Tieh (born 18 October 1974) is a Sierra Leonean footballer. He played in four matches for the Sierra Leone national football team in 1994 and 1996. He was also named in Sierra Leone's squad for the 1994 African Cup of Nations tournament.

References

1974 births
Living people
Sierra Leonean footballers
Sierra Leone international footballers
1994 African Cup of Nations players
Place of birth missing (living people)
Association footballers not categorized by position